Walter Matthau (born Walter John Matthow; October 1, 1920 – July 1, 2000) was an American actor, comedian and film director.

He is best known for his film roles in A Face in the Crowd (1957), King Creole (1958) and as a coach of a hapless little league team in the baseball comedy The Bad News Bears (1976). He also starred in 10 films alongside Jack Lemmon, including The Odd Couple (1968), The Front Page (1974) and Grumpy Old Men (1993). Matthau won the Academy Award for Best Supporting Actor for his performance in the Billy Wilder film The Fortune Cookie (1966). Matthau is also known for his performances in Stanley Donen's romance Charade (1963), Gene Kelly's musical Hello, Dolly! (1969), Elaine May's screwball comedy A New Leaf (1971) and Herbert Ross' ensemble comedy California Suite (1978). He also starred in Plaza Suite, Kotch (both 1971), Charley Varrick (1973), The Sunshine Boys (1975), and Hopscotch (1980).

On Broadway, Matthau originated the role of Oscar Madison in The Odd Couple by playwright Neil Simon, for which he received a Tony Award for Best Actor in a Play in 1965, his second after A Shot in the Dark in 1962. Matthau also received two British Academy Film Awards and a Golden Globe Award. In 1963 he received a Primetime Emmy Award nomination for his performance in The DuPont Show of the Week. In 1982, he received a star on the Hollywood Walk of Fame.

Early life
Matthau was born Walter John Matthow on October 1, 1920, in New York City's Lower East Side. He had two brothers, one older and one younger.

His mother, Rose ( Berolsky or Beransky), was a Lithuanian-Jewish immigrant who worked in a garment sweatshop, and his father, Milton Matuschansky, was a Ukrainian-Jewish peddler and electrician, from Kyiv, Ukraine. They married in New York in 1917.

As part of a lifelong love of practical jokes, Matthau created the rumors that his middle name was Foghorn and his last name was originally Matuschanskayasky (under which he is credited for a cameo role in the film Earthquake).

As a young boy, Matthau attended a Jewish non-profit sleepaway camp, Tranquillity Camp, where he first began acting in the shows the camp would stage on Saturday nights. He also attended Surprise Lake Camp. His high school was Seward Park High School. He worked for a short time as a concession stand cashier in the Yiddish Theatre District.

World War II
During World War II, Matthau saw active service as a radioman-gunner in the U.S. Army Air Forces with the Eighth Air Force in the United Kingdom, crewing a Consolidated B-24 Liberator bomber. He was with the same 453rd Bombardment Group as James Stewart. While based in England at RAF Old Buckenham in Norfolk, he flew missions across to continental Europe during the Battle of the Bulge. He ended the war with the rank of Staff Sergeant, and returned home to America for demobilization at the war's end intent on pursuing a career as an actor.

Acting career

Early work 
Matthau was trained in acting at the Dramatic Workshop of The New School with German director Erwin Piscator. He often joked that his best early review came in a play where he posed as a derelict. One reviewer said, "The others just looked like actors in make-up, Walter Matthau really looks like a skid row bum!" Matthau was a respected stage actor for years in such fare as Will Success Spoil Rock Hunter? and A Shot in the Dark, for his performance in the latter winning the 1962 Tony Award for Best Featured Actor in a Play.

Matthau appeared in the pilot of Mister Peepers (1952) with Wally Cox. For reasons unknown he used the name Leonard Elliot. His role was of the gym teacher Mr. Wall. He made his motion picture debut as a whip-wielding bad guy in The Kentuckian (1955) opposite Burt Lancaster. He played a villain in King Creole (1958), in which he gets beaten up by Elvis Presley. Around the same time, he made Ride a Crooked Trail with Audie Murphy, and Onionhead (both 1958) starring Andy Griffith; the latter was a flop. Matthau and Griffith later appeared in the critical and box office hit A Face in the Crowd (1957), directed by Elia Kazan. Matthau appeared with James Mason in Bigger Than Life (1956) directed by Nicholas Ray. Matthau directed a low-budget movie called The Gangster Story (1960) and played a sympathetic sheriff in Lonely Are the Brave (1962), which starred Kirk Douglas. He appeared in the Cary Grant-Audrey Hepburn crime thriller Charade (1963).

On television, he appeared twice on Naked City, as well as in four installments of Alfred Hitchcock Presents. He appeared eight times between 1962 and 1964 on The DuPont Show of the Week and as Franklin Gaer in an episode of Dr. Kildare ("Man Is a Rock", 1964).

1960s 

Comedies were rare in Matthau's work at that time. He was cast in a number of stark dramas, such as Fail Safe (1964), in which he portrayed Pentagon adviser Dr. Groeteschele, who urges an all-out nuclear attack on the Soviet Union in response to an accidental transmission of an attack signal to U.S. Air Force bombers. Neil Simon cast him in the play The Odd Couple in 1965, with Matthau playing slovenly sportswriter Oscar Madison, opposite Art Carney as Felix Ungar. Matthau later reprised the role in the film version, with Jack Lemmon as Felix Unger. He played detective Ted Casselle in the Hitchcockian thriller Mirage (1965), directed by Edward Dmytryk.

He achieved great success in the comedy film, The Fortune Cookie (1966), as a shyster lawyer, William H. "Whiplash Willie" Gingrich, starring yet again opposite Lemmon; the first of many collaborations with Billy Wilder, and a role that would earn him an Oscar for Best Supporting Actor. Filming had to be placed on a five-month hiatus after Matthau had a serious heart attack. He gave up his three pack a day smoking habit as a result. Matthau appeared during the Oscar telecast shortly after having been injured in a bicycle accident; nonetheless, he scolded actors who had not attended the ceremony, especially the other major award winners that night: Paul Scofield, Elizabeth Taylor and Sandy Dennis.

1970s 
Oscar nominations would come Matthau's way again for Kotch (1971), directed by Lemmon, and The Sunshine Boys (1975), another adaptation of a Neil Simon stage play, this time about a pair of former vaudeville stars. For the latter role he won a Golden Globe award for Best Actor in a Musical or Comedy. 

Broadway hits turned into films continued to cast Matthau in lead roles in Hello, Dolly! and Cactus Flower (both 1969); for the latter film, Goldie Hawn received an Oscar for Best Supporting Actress. Matthau played three roles in the film version of Simon's Plaza Suite (1971) and was in the cast of its followup California Suite (1978).

Matthau starred in three crime dramas in the mid-1970s, as a detective investigating a mass murder on a bus in The Laughing Policeman (1973), as a bank robber on the run from the Mafia and the law in Charley Varrick (also 1973) and as a New York transit official in the action-adventure The Taking of Pelham One Two Three (1974). A change of pace about misfits on a Little League baseball team turned out to be a solid hit when Matthau starred as coach Morris Buttermaker in the comedy The Bad News Bears (1976).

1980s 
Matthau looked to produce some films with Universal Pictures, with his son Charlie also becoming involved in his production company, Walcar Productions, but the only film he produced was the third remake of Little Miss Marker (1980). He was nominated for the Golden Globe Award for Best Actor—Motion Picture Musical or Comedy for his portrayal of former CIA field operative Miles Kendig in the elaborate spy comedy Hopscotch (1980), co-starring with Glenda Jackson. The original script, a dark work based on the novel of the same name, was rewritten and transformed into a comedy in order to play to Matthau's specific talents. The rewrite was a condition of his participation. Matthau participated in the script revisions, and the film's director, Ronald Neame, observed that Matthau's contributions entitled him to screen credit, but that was never pursued. Matthau wrote the scene in which Kendig and Isobel—apparently strangers—meet in a Salzburg restaurant and strike up a conversation about wine that ends in a passionate kiss. He also wrote the last scene of the film, where Kendig, presumed to be dead, disguises himself as a Sikh in order to enter a bookshop. He also helped in choosing appropriate compositions by Mozart that made up much of the score. TCM's Susan Doll observes that "Hopscotch could be considered the end of a long career peak or the beginning of (Matthau's) slide downhill, depending on the viewpoint," as character parts and supporting parts became the only thing available to an actor his age.

The next year, he was nominated again for the Golden Globe Award for Best Actor—Motion Picture Musical or Comedy for his portrayal of the fictional Associate Justice Daniel Snow in First Monday in October (1981). The film was about the (fictional) first appointment of a woman (played by Jill Clayburgh) to the Supreme Court of the United States. It was scheduled for release in 1982, but when President Ronald Reagan named Sandra Day O'Connor in July 1981, the release date was moved up to August 1981. New York Times critic Janet Maslin disliked the film but praised Matthau's performance. Matthau portrayed Herbert Tucker in I Ought to Be in Pictures (1982), with Ann-Margret and Dinah Manoff. Matthau took the leading role of Captain Thomas Bartholomew Red in Roman Polanski's swashbuckler Pirates (1986).

During the 1980s and 1990s Matthau served on the advisory board of the National Student Film Institute.

1990s 
Matthau narrated the Doctor Seuss Video Classics: How the Grinch Stole Christmas! (1992) and played the role of Mr. Wilson in the film Dennis the Menace (1993). In a change of pace, Matthau played Albert Einstein in the film I.Q. (1994), starring Tim Robbins and Meg Ryan.

His partnership with Jack Lemmon became one of the most enduring collaborations in Hollywood. They became lifelong friends after making The Fortune Cookie and would make a total of 10 movies together—11 counting Kotch, in which Lemmon has a cameo as a sleeping bus passenger. Apart from their many comedies, the two appeared (although they did not share any scenes) in the Oliver Stone drama, JFK (1991). Matthau and Lemmon reunited for the comedy Grumpy Old Men (1993), co-starring Ann-Margret, and its sequel, Grumpier Old Men (1995), also co-starring Sophia Loren. This led to further pairings late in their careers, Out to Sea (1997) and a Simon-scripted sequel to their much earlier success, The Odd Couple II (1998).

Hanging Up (2000), directed by Diane Keaton, was Matthau's final appearance onscreen.

Personal life

Marriages
Matthau was married twice: first to Grace Geraldine Johnson from 1948 to 1958, and then to Carol Marcus from 1959 until his death in 2000. He had two children, Jenny and David, by his first wife, and a son, Charlie Matthau, with his second wife. Matthau also helped raise his stepchildren, Aram Saroyan and Lucy Saroyan.

Health problems
A heavy smoker, Matthau had a heart attack in 1966 while filming The Fortune Cookie, the first of at least three in his lifetime.

In 1976, ten years after his first heart attack, he underwent heart bypass surgery. After working in Minnesota for Grumpy Old Men (1993), he was hospitalized for double pneumonia. In December 1995, he had a colon tumor removed, apparently successfully, as there was no mention of cancer in his death certificate. He was hospitalized in May 1999 for more than two months, owing again to pneumonia.

His death certificate lists the causes of death as "cardiac arrest" and "atherosclerotic heart disease" with "end stage renal disease" and "atrial fibrillation" as significant contributing factors. There is no mention of cancer.

Death

Matthau had atherosclerotic heart disease during the last years of his life. On the late evening of June 30, 2000, he had a heart attack at his home and was taken by ambulance to the St. John's Health Center in Santa Monica where he died a few hours later at 1:42 a.m. on July 1, 2000, at age 79. He was buried in Westwood Village Memorial Park Cemetery in Los Angeles. Matthau's wife Carol Marcus died in 2003, and her body was interred in the same grave as her husband.

Filmography

Awards and nominations

Citations

References 
 Profile at Hollywood Memoir, accessed April 8, 2015.

Further reading

External links

1920 births
2000 deaths
Male actors from New York City
Jewish American male comedians
American male film actors
United States Army Air Forces personnel of World War II
American male stage actors
American male television actors
Best Musical or Comedy Actor Golden Globe (film) winners
Best Supporting Actor Academy Award winners
Best Actor BAFTA Award winners
Burials at Westwood Village Memorial Park Cemetery
Jewish American male actors
American people of Russian-Jewish descent
Tony Award winners
United States Army Air Forces soldiers
David di Donatello winners
20th-century American male actors
American people of Lithuanian-Jewish descent
Jewish American military personnel
The New School alumni
Military personnel from New York City
20th-century American comedians
Seward Park High School alumni
People from the Lower East Side
20th-century American Jews